Leora is a Hebrew female given name, which means "light unto me" or "I have light". Alternative spellings may be Liora or Liorah. The name can be a diminutive form of Eleanor. A male variant is Leor. The name Leora may refer to:

People
Leora Auslander (born 1959), American historian
Leora Dana (1923–1983), American actress
Leora Skolkin-Smith (born 1952), American novelist
Leora Spellman (1890–1945), American actress
Liora Fadlon Simon (born 1970), Israeli singer, represented Israel in the Eurovision Song Contest 1995
Liora Itzhak (born 1974), Israeli singer
Liora Ofer (born 1953), Israeli businesswoman
Leora Bettison Robinson (1840–1914), American author, educator

Other uses
Leora's stream salamander
Leora, Missouri

See also
Leor
Laura (given name)
Lorna

References 

Hebrew feminine given names